Monocytopenia is a form of leukopenia associated with a deficiency of monocytes.

It has been proposed as a measure to predict neutropenia, though some research indicates that it is less effective than lymphopenia.

Causes
The causes of monocytopenia include: acute infections, stress, treatment with glucocorticoids, aplastic anemia, hairy cell leukemia, acute myeloid leukemia, treatment with myelotoxic drugs and genetic syndromes, as for example MonoMAC syndrome.

Diagnosis
- Blood Test (CBC) (Normal range of Monocytes: 1-10%) (Normal range in males: 0.2-0.8 x 10 3 /microliter)

- Blood test checking for monocypenia (Abnormal ranges: <1%) (Abnormal range in males: <0.2 10 3 /microliter)

Treatment

References

External links 

Monocyte and granulocyte disorders